Thomas R. King was Chairman of the Democratic Party of Wisconsin.

Career
King chaired the Democratic Party of Wisconsin from 1943 to 1944. During the same period, he was a member of the Democratic National Committee. He was also a delegate to the 1944 Democratic National Convention.

References

Democratic Party of Wisconsin chairs
Year of death missing
Year of birth missing